Shannon Falls Provincial Park is a provincial park in British Columbia, Canada.

The falls are named after a William Shannon who first settled the property in 1889 and made bricks in the area.

The park also protects the surrounding area on the north-east shore of the Howe Sound.

Just to the north are Murrin Provincial Park and Stawamus Chief Provincial Park. Located immediately across the highway from Shannon Falls is a privately operated campground and restaurant, plus the entrance to the Darrell Bay ferry terminal for Woodfibre (Darrell Bay was formerly named Shannon Bay). The Sea to Sky Gondola adjoins the park. The gondola line was deliberately cut in 2019 and again in 2020 after repairs.

The falls and adjoining woods are commonly used in television and film production.

Hikers can view Shannon Creek below the falls in the park and above the falls via the Sea to Summit Trail. The adjacent cliff walls are used by rock climbers. Shannon Falls rarely freezes; when it does, it's the subject of intense ice climbing interest.

Gallery

See also
List of waterfalls of British Columbia

References

External links

BC Parks website "Shannon Falls Provincial Park"

Upper Shannon Falls Hiking Trail.

Provincial parks of British Columbia
Waterfalls of British Columbia
Sea-to-Sky Corridor
Horsetail waterfalls
Protected areas established in 1984
1984 establishments in British Columbia